The Kentucky Wesleyan Panthers football program represents Kentucky Wesleyan College in college football as a member of the Great Midwest Athletic Conference at the NCAA Division II level. The college's football program began in 1907, lasting until 1930, when it was discontinued due to financial reasons. In 1982, the decision was made to re-establish a football program at the school, with the school resuming football operations the following year. Initially, the Panthers were an NCAA Division III team, unaffiliated with any conference.  They moved into Division II beginning with the 1994 football season.

History

1907–1930
Not much information is available regarding the Panthers teams of the early 20th century.  The team played teams such as Kentucky, Marshall, and Xavier.  According to the scant material available through Fanbase.com, they did not have much success during this period.  Eventually, due to financial reasons, the football program was discontinued after the 1930 season.

Division III – 1983–1993

1983–1989 
When the football program was re-established at Kentucky Wesleyan in 1983, the school played at the Division III level as an independent school, unaffiliated with any conference.  That first season, they finished with a 3–5 record, and they followed that with another nine straight losing seasons before posting a 6–4 record in 1993.  The Panther's first coach after the re-establishment of the program was Billy Mitchell, who compiled a record of 22–41–3 during his seven seasons.

1990–1993
Mitchell was succeeded by Randy Awrey, who had been the defensive coordinator for four years at another Division III school, St. Lawrence University.  He posted four losing seasons, before posting the school's first winning season in 1993 at 6–4.  In their first winning season in 1993, the team set records for passing completion percentage (55.7%) and defensive pass interceptions (21). On the defensive side that year, Troy Crissman led all NCAA Division III defenders with 9 interceptions.

Division II

1994–2002 
In 1994 the Panthers moved to NCAA Division II level football and hired John Johnson, a former assistant coach with the Green Bay Packers. In his nine years as head coach, from 1994 to 2002, Johnson's overall record was 34–58. Those 34 wins are still the most by any Kentucky Wesleyan football coach. While he had a losing record during his tenure, the Panthers played NCAA Division I-AA teams 26 times, losing all 26 games.  Johnson had two winning seasons as KWC's head football coach, 6–4 in 1997 and 7–4 in 1999.  The 1999 KWC football team set the record with the most wins in a season with (7), finishing with a 7–4 record.  The 1999 team started the season 5–0 (tying a school record) and rose to #1 in the NCAA Division II Non-Scholarship Poll by Don Hansen's National Weekly Football Gazette on October 17, 1999, finishing the season ranked #2. Don Hansen's Football Gazette named John Johnson the 1999 NCAA Division II Non-Scholarship National Coach of the Year and Linebacker Nick Boling (1997–2001) was named the 1999 NCAA Division II Non-Scholarship Linebacker of the Year.

The 2000 team finished 4–6, but finished 10th in NCAA Division II Football for total offense (434.4 yards per game).  Wide receiver Corey Jordan (1997–2001) was named the 2000 NCAA Division II Non-Scholarship National Receiver of the Year by Don Hansen's National Weekly Football Gazette.  The 2001 and 2002 teams finished with a combined record of 2–19, but WR Corey Jordan, LB Vince Brodt, and LB Frank Wintrich, were named NCAA Division II Mid-Major 1st Team All-Americans by Don Hansen's National Weekly Football Gazette for 2001.  Following the 2002 season, offensive lineman Jake Colson (1998–2002) was selected as an NCAA Division II Mid-Major 1st Team All-American by Don Hansen's National Weekly Football Gazette. Following consecutive one-win seasons, John Johnson's tenure at Kentucky Wesleyan ended January 1, 2003.

2003–present
Current head coach, Brent Holsclaw, a former Kentucky Wesleyan quarterback, was hired in January 2002.  Through the 2013 football season, Holsclaw's overall record at Kentucky Wesleyan is 24–94.  In Holsclaw's first season as KWC's head football coach, Holsclaw's 2003 Panthers finished 1–9.  Unaffiliated to this point, the Panthers joined the NAIA's Mid-South Conference in 2004 and remained in the conference for 2005.  In 2006 the Panthers returned to NCAA Division II, becoming a charter member of the Great Lakes Football Conference. The 2006 Panthers finished 0–11; the eleven losses were the most in school history. The 2013 team under Holsclaw, in his 11th season, equaled their worst season in 2006 by going 0–11.

Facilities
From 1983 to 2003 the Kentucky Wesleyan Football team played their home games at Owensboro area high schools. In 2004, the Panthers began playing their home football games at Bullet Wilson Field, an on-campus field completed prior to the 2004 football season. The playing surface at Independence Bank Field features FieldTurf, an artificial playing surface. The stadium around the field underwent a major upgrade project following the 2006 season. When the upgrade was completed the home of the Panthers football team was to be known as Steele Stadium.

Alumni in the pros
Three former Kentucky Wesleyan football players have played in the Arena Football League (AFL).  Wide receiver Anthony Payton (1994–1996) played four seasons in the AFL for New Jersey Red Dogs (2000 and 2001), Buffalo Destroyers (2003), and Las Vegas Gladiators (2005).  Defensive lineman Karl Bates (1997–1999) played seven seasons in the AFL for the Houston Thunderbears (2000 and 2001), New Jersey Gladiators (2002), Las Vegas Gladiators (2003), Detroit Fury (2004), Las Vegas Gladiators (2005), and San Jose SaberCats (2006).  Wide receiver Sedrick Robinson (1993–1996) has played seven years in the AFL for the Houston Thunderbears (2001), New Jersey Gladiators (2002), Las Vegas Gladiators (2003), Columbus Destroyers (2004 and 2005), and Austin Wranglers (2006 and 2007).

Wide receiver Keelan Cole currently plays for the Las Vegas Raiders of the National Football League (NFL).

Individual records

 Most rushing yards (career):  1,853 – Jeremy Sleet (1994–1997)
 Most rushing yards (season):  839 – Letiz Arnold (2005)
 Most rushing touchdowns (career):   23 – Bobby Ratcliff (1991–1994)
 Most rushing touchdowns (season):  12 – Drew Hall (1999–2000) – 2000
 Most rushing attempts (career):   363 – Jeremy Sleet (1994–1997)
 Most rushing attempts (season):  149 – Letiz Arnold (2005)
 Most passing yards (career):   7,440 – J.D. Meyers (1996–1999)
 Most passing yards (season):  2,565 – Brian Hoffman (2000) – 2000
 Most passing touchdowns (career):   64 – J.D. Meyers (1996–1999)
 Most pass attempts (career):   1,033 – J.D. Meyers (1996–1999)
 Most pass completions (career):  519 – J.D. Meyers (1996–1999)
 Most pass completions (season):  207 – Brent Holsclaw (1991–1993) – 1993
 Passing percentage (career):  54.1% – Brian Hoffman (2000)
 Passing percentage (season):  55.8% – Brent Holsclaw (1991–1993) – 1993
 Receiving yards (career):  3,328 – Sedric Robinson (1993–1996)
 Receiving yards (season):  1,105 – Sedric Robinson (1993–1996 – 1995
 Receptions (career):  191 – Sedrick Robinson (1993–1996)
 Receptions (season):  68 – Sedrick Robinson (1993–1996) – 1995
 Receiving touchdowns (career):  42 – Sedrick Robinson (1993–1996)
 Receiving touchdowns (season):  17 – Sedrick Robinson (1993–1996) – 1995
 Touchdowns scored (career):  46 – Sedrick Robinson (1993–1996)
 All purpose yards (career):  5,601 – Sedrick Robinson (1993–1996)
 Kick return yards (career):  1,772 – Sedrick Robinson (1993–1996)
 Total points (career):  298 – Sedrick Robinson (1993–1996)
 Total points (season):  116 – Sedrick Robinson (1993–1996) – 1995
 Interceptions (career):  21 – Ryan Davis (1991–1994)
 Tackles (career):  347 – Brian Sieder (1994–1997)
 Sacks (career):  31.5 – Alex Temple (2004–2007)
 Punt yards (career):  7,401 – Steve Wolf (1983–1987)
 Punt attempts (career):  193 – Steve Wolf (1983–1987)
 Average yards per punt (career):  38.35 – Steve Wolf (1983–1987)
 Average yards per punt (season):  40.4 – Steve Wolf – 1983

Team records

 Tackles (season):  632.5 – 2004
 Pass completions (season):  234 – 2000
 Passing yards (season):  3,035 – 2000
 Passing touchdowns (season):  27 – 2000
 Pass receptions (season):  234 – 2000
 Total offense (season):  4,521 – 1994
 Touchdowns (season):  73 – 1994
 Points scored (season):  333 – 1994
 Punt attempts (season):  81 – 1990
 Rushing yards (season):  2,186 – 1986
 Rushing attempts (season):  510 – 1989
 Rushing touchdowns (season):  22 – 1989

References

External links
 

 
American football teams established in 1907
1907 establishments in Kentucky